Home Rule Act may refer to:

 Government of Ireland Act 1914, sometimes called the "Third Home Rule Act"
 Government of Ireland Act 1920, sometimes called the "Fourth Home Rule Act"
 District of Columbia Home Rule Act, a 1973 act of the United States Congress
 1979 Greenlandic home rule referendum, on greater autonomy from Denmark

See also
 Home rule
 Home Rule Cities Act (Michigan)
 Home Rule Party (disambiguation)